Rhypholophus is a genus of crane fly in the family Limoniidae.

Distribution
Europe & North America.

Species
R. arapaho (Alexander, 1958)
R. bicuspidatus (Alexander, 1945)
R. bifidarius (Alexander, 1919)
R. bifurcatus Goetghebuer, 1920
R. dufouri Geiger and Podenas, 1993
R. fumatus Doane, 1900
R. haemorrhoidalis (Zetterstedt, 1838)
R. hoodianus (Alexander, 1945)
R. imitator Savchenko, 1981
R. intermixtus (Savchenko, 1973)
R. libellus (Alexander, 1943)
R. lichtwardti (Lackschewitz, 1935)
R. malickyi (Mendl, 1975)
R. obtusistyla (Stary, 1976)
R. oregonicus (Alexander, 1945)
R. paradiseus (Alexander, 1920)
R. phryganopterus Kolenati, 1860
R. simulans (Savchenko, 1973)
R. suffumatus (Alexander, 1943)
R. varius (Meigen, 1818)
R. wasatchensis (Alexander, 1948)

References

Limoniidae
Diptera of North America
Nematoceran flies of Europe
Tipuloidea genera
Taxa named by Friedrich August Rudolph Kolenati